Andrew Harold Rubin (June 22, 1946 – October 5, 2015) was an American actor most known for his role of George Martín in the 1984 film Police Academy.

Early years
Rubin was born June 22, 1946, in New Bedford, Massachusetts.  His father, Simon, owned a furniture and bedding factory and his mother, Leona (nee Greenstone) was an artist and international travel writer. He graduated from the American Academy of Dramatic Arts in New York City.

Television
Rubin "began appearing in commercials in the late 1960s." Andrew had a role in the television series Shazam! (TV series) on the episode titled "The Boy Who Said 'No'" which aired October 26, 1974. He was one of the stars of Hometown, a 1985 CBS program.
Rubin also originated the role of Allan Willis, the eldest child of Tom and Helen Willis, on The Jeffersons.  He introduced the character in a single episode episode guest appearance ("Jenny's Low") during the first season.  The character reappeared as a regular for Season 5 with a new actor in the role, and disappeared again by the end of that season.

Death
On October 5, 2015, Rubin died of lung cancer in Los Angeles, California.

Filmography

References

External links
 

 Andrew Rubin At Find A Grave

1946 births
2015 deaths
American male film actors
American male television actors
Deaths from lung cancer in California
Male actors from Massachusetts
People from New Bedford, Massachusetts
20th-century American male actors